Joe Staten Bain (4 July 1912, Spokane, Washington – 7 September 1991, Columbus, Ohio) was an American economist associated with the University of California, Berkeley.  Bain was designated a Distinguished Fellow by the American Economic Association in 1982. An accompanying statement referred to him as "the undisputed father of modern Industrial Organization Economics."

Background and career
Bain received an A.B. from UCLA in 1935. He studied at Harvard, where he has also an instructor in Economics from 1936 to 1939.  There he received an M.A. in 1939 and Ph.D. in 1940, under the direction of Joseph Schumpeter, Edward Chamberlin and Edward Mason. The title of his dissertation was "The Value, Depreciation and Replacement of Durable Capital Goods".

Bain was appointed Lecturer at the University of California, Berkeley in 1939 and served there until his retirement in 1975. He also served in 1960 as director of studies at the California Water Industry.

Contributions
Bain was a prolific author, at both the theoretical and applied level. Major works included The Economics of the Pacific Coast Petroleum Industry (1944-1947) described as "a landmark in the application and empirical testing of the hypotheses of microeconomic theory."  His work in the 1950s culminated in Barriers to New Competition (1956), and Industrial Organization: A Treatise (1959).

Bain developed the paradigm of structure, conduct, and performance as related to the industry, as distinct from individual firms or industries. It postulated and tested barriers to entry as a determinant of industry performance.  Market concentration was analyzed in relation to market power and rate of profit.

Selected works
 1941. "The Profit Rate as a Measure of Monopoly Power," Quarterly Journal of Economics, 55(2), pp. 271-293.
 "Market Classifications in Modern Price Theory," Quarterly Journal of Economics,  56(4),  pp. 560-574.
 1944–1947. "The Economics of the Pacific Coast Petroleum Industry" (3 vols.).
 1948. Pricing, Distribution and Employment: Economics of an Enterprise System, Holt.
 1948. "Price and Production Policies," in Howard Ellis, ed., A Survey of Contemporary Economics,  Blakiston, pp. 129–173.
 1950 "A Note on Pricing in Monopoly and Oligopoly," American Economic Review, 40(2), pp. 35-47.
 1951. "Relation of Profit Rate to Industry Concentration: American Manufacturing, 1936-1940," Quarterly Journal of Economics, 65(3), pp. 293-324.
 1952. "Price Theory".
 1954a. "Economies of Scale, Concentration and the Condition of Entry in Twenty Manufacturing Industries," American Economic Review, 44(1), pp. 15-39.
 1954b. "Conditions of Entry and the Emergence of Monopoly," in Monopoly and Competition and Their Regulation, Edward H. Chamberlin, ed., Macmillan, pp. 215–41.
 1966a. "Chamberlin's Impact on Microeconomic Theory," in Monopolistic Competition Theory, Robert Kuenne, ed.
 1966b. International Differences in Industrial Structure: Eight Nations in the 1950s, Yale University Press, 1966. Abstract.
 1966. Northern California's Water Industry, with Richard E. Caves and Julius Margolis, Johns Hopkins Press for Resources for the Future.
 1970. Essays on Economic Development, Institute of Business and Economic Research, University of California.
 1972. Essays on Price Theory and Industrial Organization,  Littre, Brown.
 1973. Environmental Decay: Economic Causes and Remedies, Little, Brown.
 1986. "Structure Versus Conduct as Indicators of Market Performance: The Chicago School Events Revisited," Antitrust Law and Economics Review. Preview.

Notes

1912 births
1991 deaths
20th-century American economists
University of California, Los Angeles alumni
Harvard Graduate School of Arts and Sciences alumni
University of California, Berkeley College of Letters and Science faculty
Distinguished Fellows of the American Economic Association